Karel Hendrik van Brederode (11 December 1827 – 19 September 1897) was a Dutch engineer and architect of railway stations.

Buildings 
Over 110 railway stations in the Netherlands were built following Brederode's design. Among these were:
 Den Helder railway station (1862–1958; demolished)
 Roermond railway station (1862)
 Sittard railway station (1862–1923)
 Tilburg railway station (1862–1961; demolished)
 Harlingen railway station (1863)
 Leeuwarden railway station (1863)
 Zutphen railway station (1863–1951; demolished)
 Alkmaar railway station (1864)
 Eindhoven railway station (1864–1912; demolished)
 Hoogezand-Sappemeer railway station (1865–1989; demolished)
 Scheemda railway station (1865)
 Steenwijk railway station (1865–1972; demolished)
 Winschoten railway station (1865)
 Zuidbroek railway station (1865)
 Zwolle railway station (1866)
 Vught railway station (1866) 
 Nieuweschans railway station (1867–1973; demolished)

References 

1827 births
1897 deaths
19th-century Dutch architects
19th-century Dutch engineers
People from Haarlem